The 2008–09 New York Rangers season was the franchise's 82nd season of play and their 83rd season overall. It saw the Rangers qualify for the playoffs for the fourth consecutive season. The Rangers started the season in Europe; first, as part of the inaugural Victoria Cup being held in Switzerland, the Rangers played an exhibition game against SC Bern on September 30, and then the main game against the 2008 European Champions Metallurg Magnitogorsk on October 1 (the first game between a Russian club and an NHL team since 1991). They won both games, and were awarded the first Victoria Cup. The Rangers battled from a 3–0 deficit in the Victoria Cup to win the game by a score of 4–3. Ryan Callahan scored the game-winning goal with 20 seconds left.

On October 3, 2008 Chris Drury was named the 25th captain in Rangers history. The Rangers opened the NHL regular season against the Tampa Bay Lightning with two games in Prague, Czech Republic, on October 4 and 5. Alexei Cherepanov, a former first-round draft pick of the Rangers, died suddenly on October 13 during a Kontinental Hockey League (KHL) game in Moscow. The Rangers tied the 1983–84 Rangers for the best start in franchise history with a 5–0 record. The quest for the greatest start in franchise history was put to a halt on October 15, 2008, with a 3–1 loss to the Buffalo Sabres.  The Rangers set the franchise record for best start in a season by going 10–2–1 for 21 points in the first 13 games. The 10 wins and 21 points both marked franchise records. On January 24, 2009, the festivities for the 2009 NHL All-Star Game began in Montreal with Brandon Dubinsky and Marc Staal playing for the Sophomore Team in the YoungStars Game. Staal scored two goals in the game, but the Rookie Team won 9–5. Henrik Lundqvist was the Rangers' only All-Star selection, and stopped 12 of 16 shots in the Elimination Shootout during the SuperSkills Competition. On January 25, 2009, Lundqvist stopped 15 of the 21 shots he faced in the second period of the All-Star Game, helping the East beat the West 12–11 in a shootout. On February 3, 2009, the New York Rangers retired Adam Graves' number 9 jersey before a game against the Atlanta Thrashers, joining fellow 1994 Stanley Cup champion teammates Brian Leetch, Mark Messier and Mike Richter, as well as Ranger greats Rod Gilbert and Eddie Giacomin, in the rafters of Madison Square Garden. On February 22, the Rangers retired Andy Bathgate's number 9 and Harry Howell's number 3 jerseys before a game against the Toronto Maple Leafs. A day later, Head Coach Tom Renney was fired after five seasons with the Rangers. Former Rangers assistant coach and coach of the 2004 Stanley Cup champion Tampa Bay Lightning, John Tortorella, was hired later that same day to replace Renney. Rangers Assistant general manager Jim Schoenfeld was given the interim assistant coaching position. Shortly after that, Sean Avery made his return to the Rangers, claimed off waivers from the Dallas Stars. Head Coach John Tortorella was suspended for Game 6 of the Rangers–Washington Capitals playoff series after an altercation with a fan towards the end of the Rangers' 4–0 loss in Washington, D.C., during Game 5. On May 4, 2009, Markus Naslund announced that he would be retiring after one season with the Rangers.

Pre-season

|- align="center" bgcolor="#FFBBBB"
| 1 || September 20 || @ Ottawa Senators || 3 - 2 || Valiquette || 0-1-0
|- align="center" bgcolor="#CCFFCC"
| 2 || September 22 || Ottawa Senators || 2 - 1 || Lundqvist || 1-1-0
|- align="center" bgcolor="#FFBBBB"
| 3 || September 23 || @ Tampa Bay Lightning || 3 - 2 || Wiikman || 1-2-0
|- align="center" bgcolor="#FFBBBB"
| 4 || September 24 || @ New Jersey Devils || 3 - 2 || Lundqvist || 1-3-0
|- align="center" bgcolor="#FFBBBB"
| 5 || September 25 || Tampa Bay Lightning || 4 - 2 || Valiquette || 1-4-0
|- align="center" bgcolor="#FFBBBB"
| 6 || September 27 || New Jersey Devils || 4 - 2 || Lundqvist || 1-5-0
|- align="center" bgcolor="#CCFFCC"
| 7 || September 30 (in Bern, Switzerland) || SC Bern || 8 - 1 || Valiquette || 2-5-0
|- align="center" bgcolor="#CCFFCC"
| 8 || October 1 (in Bern, Switzerland) || Metallurg Magnitogorsk || 4 - 3 || Lundqvist || 3-5-0
|-

Regular season

The Rangers finished the regular season with the League's best penalty-kill percentage, at 87.84%.

Divisional standings

Conference standings

Schedule and results

|- align="center" bgcolor="#CCFFCC"
| 1 || 4 (in Prague, Czech Republic || @ Tampa Bay Lightning || 2 - 1 || Lundqvist || 1-0-0
|- align="center" bgcolor="#CCFFCC"
| 2 || 5 (in Prague, Czech Republic) || Tampa Bay Lightning || 2 - 1 || Lundqvist || 2-0-0
|- align="center" bgcolor="#CCFFCC"
| 3 || 10 || Chicago Blackhawks || 4 - 2 || Lundqvist || 3-0-0
|- align="center" bgcolor="#CCFFCC"
| 4 || 11 || @ Philadelphia Flyers || 4 - 3 || Valiquette || 4-0-0
|- align="center" bgcolor="#CCFFCC"
| 5 || 13 || New Jersey Devils || 4 - 1 || Lundqvist || 5-0-0
|- align="center" bgcolor="#FFBBBB"
| 6 || 15 || Buffalo Sabres || 3 - 1 || Lundqvist || 5-1-0
|- align="center" bgcolor="#CCFFCC"
| 7 || 17 || Toronto Maple Leafs || 1 - 0 SO || Valiquette || 6-1-0
|- align="center" bgcolor="white"
| 8 || 18 || @ Detroit Red Wings || 5 - 4 OT || Lundqvist || 6-1-1
|- align="center" bgcolor="#FFBBBB"
| 9 || 20 || Dallas Stars || 2 - 1 || Lundqvist || 6-2-1
|- align="center" bgcolor="#CCFFCC"
| 10 || 24 || @ Columbus Blue Jackets || 3 - 1 || Lundqvist || 7-2-1
|- align="center" bgcolor="#CCFFCC"
| 11 || 25 || Pittsburgh Penguins || 3 - 2 SO || Lundqvist || 8-2-1
|- align="center" bgcolor="#CCFFCC"
| 12 || 27 || @ New York Islanders || 4 - 2 || Lundqvist || 9-2-1
|- align="center" bgcolor="#CCFFCC"
| 13 || 30 || Atlanta Thrashers || 3 - 2 || Lundqvist || 10-2-1
|-

|- align="center" bgcolor="#FFBBBB"
| 14 || 1 || @ Toronto Maple Leafs || 5 - 2 || Valiquette || 10-3-1
|- align="center" bgcolor="#FFBBBB"
| 15 || 4 || New York Islanders || 2 - 1 || Lundqvist || 10-4-1
|- align="center" bgcolor="#CCFFCC"
| 16 || 6 || Tampa Bay Lightning || 5 - 2 || Lundqvist || 11-4-1
|- align="center" bgcolor="#FFBBBB"
| 17 || 8 || @ Washington Capitals || 3 - 1 || Lundqvist || 11-5-1
|- align="center" bgcolor="white"
| 18 || 10 || Edmonton Oilers || 3 - 2 SO || Lundqvist || 11-5-2
|- align="center" bgcolor="#CCFFCC"
| 19 || 12 || @ New Jersey Devils || 5 - 2 || Lundqvist || 12-5-2
|- align="center" bgcolor="#CCFFCC"
| 20 || 15 || Boston Bruins || 3 - 2 SO || Lundqvist || 13-5-2
|- align="center" bgcolor="#CCFFCC"
| 21 || 17 || Ottawa Senators || 2 - 1 SO || Lundqvist || 14-5-2
|- align="center" bgcolor="#FFBBBB"
| 22 || 19 || Vancouver Canucks || 6 - 3 || Lundqvist || 14-6-2
|- align="center" bgcolor="#FFBBBB"
| 23 || 22 || @ Ottawa Senators || 4 - 1 || Valiquette || 14-7-2
|- align="center" bgcolor="#CCFFCC"
| 24 || 24 || Phoenix Coyotes || 4 - 1 || Lundqvist || 15-7-2
|- align="center" bgcolor="#CCFFCC"
| 25 || 26 || @ Tampa Bay Lightning || 3 - 2 SO || Lundqvist || 16-7-2
|- align="center" bgcolor="#CCFFCC"
| 26 || 28 || @ Florida Panthers || 4 - 3 SO || Lundqvist || 17-7-2
|- align="center" bgcolor="#FFBBBB"
| 27 || 30 || Florida Panthers || 4 - 0 || Lundqvist|| 17-8-2
|-

|- align="center" bgcolor="#CCFFCC"
| 28 || 3 || Pittsburgh Penguins || 3 - 2 SO || Lundqvist || 18-8-2
|- align="center" bgcolor="#FFBBBB"
| 29 || 4 || @ Montreal Canadiens || 6 - 2 || Lundqvist || 18-9-2
|- align="center" bgcolor="#FFBBBB"
| 30 || 7 || Calgary Flames || 3 - 0 || Lundqvist || 18-10-2
|- align="center" bgcolor="#CCFFCC"
| 31 || 10 || @ Atlanta Thrashers || 3 - 2 OT || Valiquette || 19-10-2
|- align="center" bgcolor="#FFBBBB"
| 32 || 12 || @ New Jersey Devils || 8 - 5 || Lundqvist || 19-11-2
|- align="center" bgcolor="#CCFFCC"
| 33 || 13 || Carolina Hurricanes || 3 - 2 SO || Lundqvist || 20-11-2
|- align="center" bgcolor="#CCFFCC"
| 34 || 16 || @ Anaheim Ducks || 3 - 1 || Lundqvist || 21-11-2
|- align="center" bgcolor="#CCFFCC"
| 35 || 17 || @ Los Angeles Kings || 3 - 2 OT || Valiquette || 22-11-2
|- align="center" bgcolor="#FFBBBB"
| 36 || 20 || @ San Jose Sharks || 3 - 2 || Lundqvist || 22-12-2
|- align="center" bgcolor="white"
| 37 || 23 || Washington Capitals || 5 - 4 OT || Lundqvist || 22-12-3
|- align="center" bgcolor="#FFBBBB"
| 38 || 27 || New Jersey Devils || 4 - 2 || Lundqvist || 22-13-3
|- align="center" bgcolor="#CCFFCC"
| 39 || 29 || New York Islanders || 5 - 4 || Lundqvist || 23-13-3
|-

|- align="center" bgcolor="#FFBBBB"
| 40 || 3 || @ Washington Capitals || 2 - 1 || Valiquette || 23-14-3
|- align="center" bgcolor="#CCFFCC"
| 41 || 5 || Pittsburgh Penguins || 4 - 0 || Lundqvist || 24-14-3
|- align="center" bgcolor="#FFBBBB"
| 42 || 7 || Montreal Canadiens || 6 - 3 || Lundqvist || 24-15-3
|- align="center" bgcolor="white"
| 43 || 9 || @ Buffalo Sabres || 2 - 1 SO || Valiquette || 24-15-4
|- align="center" bgcolor="#CCFFCC"
| 44 || 10 || @ Ottawa Senators || 2 - 0 || Lundqvist || 25-15-4
|- align="center" bgcolor="#CCFFCC"
| 45 || 13 || @ New York Islanders || 2 - 1 || Lundqvist || 26-15-4
|- align="center" bgcolor="#CCFFCC"
| 46 || 16 || @ Chicago Blackhawks || 3 - 2 OT || Lundqvist || 27-15-4
|- align="center" bgcolor="#FFBBBB"
| 47 || 18 || @ Pittsburgh Penguins || 3 - 0 || Lundqvist || 27-16-4
|- align="center" bgcolor="#CCFFCC"
| 48 || 20 || Anaheim Ducks || 4 - 2 || Lundqvist || 28-16-4
|- align="center" bgcolor="#CCFFCC"
| 49 || 27 || Carolina Hurricanes || 3 - 2 || Valiquette || 29-16-4
|- align="center" bgcolor="#FFBBBB"
| 50 || 28 || @ Pittsburgh Penguins || 6 - 2 || Lundqvist || 29-17-4
|- align="center" bgcolor="#FFBBBB"
| 51 || 31 || @ Boston Bruins || 1 - 0 || Lundqvist || 29-18-4
|-

|- align="center" bgcolor="white"
| 52 || 3 || Atlanta Thrashers || 2 - 1 SO || Lundqvist || 29-18-5
|- align="center" bgcolor="#FFBBBB"
| 53 || 6 || @ Dallas Stars || 10 - 2 || Valiquette || 29-19-5
|- align="center" bgcolor="#FFBBBB"
| 54 || 9 || @ New Jersey Devils || 3 - 0 || Lundqvist || 29-20-5
|- align="center" bgcolor="#CCFFCC"
| 55 || 11 || Washington Capitals || 5 - 4 SO || Lundqvist || 30-20-5
|- align="center" bgcolor="white"
| 56 || 13 || @ Florida Panthers || 2 - 1 SO || Lundqvist || 30-20-6
|- align="center" bgcolor="#FFBBBB"
| 57 || 15 || Philadelphia Flyers || 5 - 2 || Lundqvist || 30-21-6
|- align="center" bgcolor="#FFBBBB"
| 58 || 16 || @ St. Louis Blues || 2 - 1 || Lundqvist || 30-22-6
|- align="center" bgcolor="#CCFFCC"
| 59 || 18 || New York Islanders || 3 - 1 || Lundqvist || 31-22-6
|- align="center" bgcolor="#FFBBBB"
| 60 || 21 || @ Buffalo Sabres || 4 - 2 || Lundqvist || 31-23-6
|- align="center" bgcolor="white"
| 61 || 22 || Toronto Maple Leafs || 3 - 2 OT || Lundqvist || 31-23-7
|- align="center" bgcolor="white"
| 62 || 25 || @ Toronto Maple Leafs || 2 - 1 SO || Lundqvist || 31-23-8
|- align="center" bgcolor="#FFBBBB"
| 63 || 26 || Florida Panthers || 2 - 1 || Lundqvist || 31-24-8
|- align="center" bgcolor="#CCFFCC"
| 64 || 28 || Colorado Avalanche || 6 - 1 || Lundqvist || 32-24-8
|-

|- align="center" bgcolor="#CCFFCC"
| 65 || 5 || @ New York Islanders || 4 - 2 || Lundqvist || 33-24-8
|- align="center" bgcolor="#CCFFCC"
| 66 || 8 || Boston Bruins || 4 - 3 || Lundqvist || 34-24-8
|- align="center" bgcolor="#FFBBBB"
| 67 || 9 || @ Carolina Hurricanes || 3 - 0 || Valiquette || 34-25-8
|- align="center" bgcolor="#CCFFCC"
| 68 || 12 || @ Nashville Predators || 4 - 2 || Lundqvist || 35-25-8
|- align="center" bgcolor="#FFBBBB"
| 69 || 14 || @ Philadelphia Flyers || 4 - 2 || Lundqvist || 35-26-8
|- align="center" bgcolor="#CCFFCC"
| 70 || 15 || Philadelphia Flyers || 4 - 1 || Lundqvist || 36-26-8
|- align="center" bgcolor="#CCFFCC"
| 71 || 17 || @ Montreal Canadiens || 4 - 3 SO || Lundqvist || 37-26-8
|- align="center" bgcolor="#CCFFCC"
| 72 || 21 || Buffalo Sabres || 5 - 3 || Lundqvist || 38-26-8
|- align="center" bgcolor="#FFBBBB"
| 73 || 22 || Ottawa Senators || 2 - 1 || Lundqvist || 38-27-8
|- align="center" bgcolor="#CCFFCC"
| 74 || 24 || Minnesota Wild || 2 - 1 || Lundqvist || 39-27-8
|- align="center" bgcolor="white"
| 75 || 26 || @ Atlanta Thrashers || 5 - 4 SO || Valiquette || 39-27-9
|- align="center" bgcolor="#FFBBBB"
| 76 || 28 || @ Pittsburgh Penguins || 4 - 3 || Lundqvist || 39-28-9
|- align="center" bgcolor="#CCFFCC"
| 77 || 30 || New Jersey Devils || 3 - 0 || Lundqvist || 40-28-9
|-

|- align="center" bgcolor="#FFBBBB"
| 78 || 2 || @ Carolina Hurricanes || 4 - 2 || Lundqvist || 40-29-9
|- align="center" bgcolor="#FFBBBB"
| 79 || 4 || @ Boston Bruins || 1 - 0 || Lundqvist || 40-30-9
|- align="center" bgcolor="#CCFFCC"
| 80 || 7 || Montreal Canadiens || 3 - 1 || Lundqvist || 41-30-9
|- align="center" bgcolor="#CCFFCC"
| 81 || 9 || Philadelphia Flyers || 2 - 1 || Lundqvist || 42-30-9
|- align="center" bgcolor="#CCFFCC"
| 82 || 12 || @ Philadelphia Flyers || 4 - 3 || Lundqvist || 43-30-9
|-

Playoffs

The New York Rangers ended the 2008–09 regular season as the Eastern Conference's seventh seed. They were defeated in the first round by the Washington Capitals in seven games.

Key:  Win  Loss

|- align=center bgcolor="#ccffcc"
| 1 || April 15 || New York Rangers || 4 - 3 || Washington Capitals || || Lundqvist || New York Rangers lead series 1-0
|- align="center" bgcolor="#ccffcc"
| 2 || April 18 || New York Rangers || 1 - 0 || Washington Capitals ||  || Lundqvist || New York Rangers lead series 2-0
|- align="center" bgcolor="#ffbbbb"
| 3 || April 20 || Washington Capitals || 4 - 0 || New York Rangers ||  || Lundqvist || New York Rangers lead series 2-1
|- align="center" bgcolor="#ccffcc"
| 4 || April 22 || Washington Capitals || 1 - 2 || New York Rangers ||  || Lundqvist || New York Rangers lead series 3-1
|- align="center" bgcolor="ffbbbb"
| 5 || April 24 || New York Rangers || 0 - 4 || Washington Capitals ||  || Lundqvist || New York Rangers lead series 3-2
|- align="center" bgcolor="ffbbbb"
| 6 || April 26 || Washington Capitals || 5 - 3 || New York Rangers ||  || Lundqvist || Series tied 3-3
|- align="center" bgcolor="ffbbbb"
| 7 || April 28 || New York Rangers || 1 - 2 || Washington Capitals ||  || Lundqvist || Washington wins series 4-3
|-

Player statistics
Skaters

Goaltenders

†Denotes player spent time with another team before joining Rangers. Stats reflect time with Rangers only.
‡Traded mid-season. Stats reflect time with Rangers only.

Awards and records

Milestones

Transactions
The Rangers have been involved in the following transactions during the 2008–09 season.

Trades

Free agents acquired

Free agents lost

Claimed from waivers

Lost via waivers

Player signings

Draft picks
New York's picks at the 2008 NHL Entry Draft in Ottawa, Ontario:

See also
 2008–09 NHL season

Farm teams

Hartford Wolf Pack (AHL)
The 2008–09 season will be the 12th season of American Hockey League (AHL) hockey for the franchise.

Charlotte Checkers (ECHL)
The 2008–09 season will be the 16th season of ECHL hockey for the franchise.

References
 Game log: New York Rangers game log on espn.com
 Player stats: New York Rangers statistics on espn.com

New York Rangers seasons
New York Rangers
New York Rangers
New York Rangers
New York Rangers
 in Manhattan
Madison Square Garden